Psilopleura polia is a moth in the subfamily Arctiinae. It was described by Herbert Druce in 1898. It is found from southern Texas to Central America and Vanuatu.

The wingspan is about 38 mm. Adults have been recorded on wing in November in Texas.

References

Moths described in 1898
Euchromiina